Every Day I Wake Up on the Wrong Side of Capitalism is an album by rapper Sun Rise Above.

Track listing
Root and Branch (01:51)
The Ashes of Eagles (01:18)
Stockholm Syndrome (03:14)
Incarceration (01:18)
The Anti-Capitalistic Mentality (02:52)
Every Day (I Wake Up) (02:51)
Mon River Flow (03:41)
Love Hate Relationship (01:36)
What's the Point? (01:39)
Prelude to a Revolution (00:38)
Kamikaze (03:34)
Yea Right (01:32)
Illegal (featuring Truth Universal) (03:28)
Blood (On Your Loafers) (01:42)
Obomba (02:14)
Law and Order (featuring 7Wounds) (01:45)
Surrender (01:39)
The Rub (01:33)
Blow (00:49)
Memorial Day (Interlude) (00:44)
The Human Cost (03:12)

References

2011 albums
Sun Rise Above albums